Christian II generally refers to Christian II of Denmark. It may also refer to:

Christian II (Archbishop of Mainz) (1179–1253)
Christian II, Count of Oldenburg (died 1233)
Christian II, Elector of Saxony (1583–1611)
Christian II, Prince of Anhalt-Bernburg (1599–1656)
Christian II, Count Palatine of Zweibrücken-Birkenfeld (1637–1717)
Christian II, Duke of Saxe-Merseburg (1599–1656)